The Kraków Society of Friends of Fine Arts (TPSP) is a social group of artists, artisans and their supporters founded in Kraków in 1854, under the Austrian Partition of Poland. Today, the Society operates from the Art Nouveau Palace of Art erected by its own members in 1901 at the Szczepański Square in Kraków Old Town. After major renovations of the Palace in 1996, the Society organizes local and international art exhibits and numerous other art initiatives.

History

The nonprofit Society of Friends of Fine Arts was established in Kraków for the purpose of promoting Polish art and culture, against the foreign rulership of Austria-Hungary. The Society had a gallery at the Larisch'a Palace, and later in Sukiennice, exhibiting Jan Matejko among others. Four decades after its original founding, using public donations and funds acquired from the sale of Artur Grottger, on 26 June 1899 the Society began construction of its own Palace of Art along the popular Planty Park, based on design by Franciszek Mączyński. It was influenced by the Secession Building in Vienna and is also colloquially known as "Secession" (Secesja).

After two years of meticulous construction, the gallery was ceremonially inaugurated on 11 May 1901 by the Mayor of Kraków, Count Edward Aleksander Raczyński. It was the first Art Nouveau building in the city, inspired by the Ancient Greek temples, with Apollo's sculpted head above its entrance, and Modernist reliefs on outside walls designed by Professor Jacek Malczewski from the Academy of Fine Arts in Kraków.

In early 20th century, the Palace run by the Society became one of the main exhibition venues of the Young Poland movement. Today, the reborn Society composed of members of the Rotary International upholds its original mission of promoting contemporary art, both Polish and international. It organizes art auctions on site, sponsors its own Institute of Research and artwork Documentation (Instytut Badań i Dokumentacji) and publishes art catalogues about painting, graphic arts, drawing and sculpture.

References

Polish art
Polish culture
Culture in Kraków
Art Nouveau architecture in Poland